Year 992 (CMXCII) was a leap year starting on Friday (link will display the full calendar) of the Julian calendar.

Events 
 By place 

 Worldwide 
 Winter – A superflare from the sun causes an Aurora Borealis, with visibility as far south as Germany and Korea. 

 Europe 
 Spring – Pietro II Orseolo, doge of Venice, concludes a treaty with Emperor Basil II to transport Byzantine troops, in exchange for commercial privileges in Constantinople. Venetian ships are exempted from customs duties at Abydos (mostly foreign goods are carried on Venetian ships). Venetian merchants in Constantinople are placed directly under the Grand Logothetes (Minister of Finance). 
 May 25 – Mieszko I, prince (duke) of the Polans, dies after a reign of more than 30 years at Poznań. He is succeeded by his son Bolesław I the Brave who becomes ruler of Poland. Having inherited the principality (located between the Oder and the Warta rivers), Bolesław forms an alliance with the Holy Roman Empire.  
 June 27 – Battle of Conquereuil: The Angevins under Fulk III "the Black", Count of Anjou, defeat the forces of Conan I, duke of Brittany, who is killed in the battle at Conquereuil (France).
 Approximate date – Norse Viking settlers establish a mint in Dublin (Ireland), to produce silver pennies.

Births 
 August 1 – Hyeonjong, king of Goryeo (Korea) (d. 1031)
 Fujiwara no Michimasa, Japanese nobleman (d. 1054)
 Fujiwara no Yorimichi, Japanese nobleman (d. 1071)
 Guido Monaco, Italian monk and music theorist (or 991)
 Otto Orseolo, doge of Venice (approximate date)
 Ulric Manfred II, count of Turin (approximate date)

Deaths 
 February 1 – Jawhar al-Siqilli, Fatimid general
 February 29 – Oswald, archbishop of Worcester
 May 25 – Mieszko I, prince (duke) of Poland
 June 15 – Michael I, Kievan metropolitan bishop
 June 27 – Conan I, duke of Brittany 
 July 1 – Heonjeong, queen of Goryeo (Korea) (b. 961)
 August 23 – Volkold, bishop of Meissen
 December 3 – Lothar II, German nobleman 
 Æthelwine, ealdorman of East Anglia
 Abu al-Hassan al-Amiri, Persian philosopher
 Adso of Montier-en-Der, Frankish abbot (b. 920)
 Fujiwara no Nakafumi, Japanese waka poet (b. 923)
 Fujiwara no Tamemitsu, Japanese statesman (b. 942)
 Herbert of Wetterau, German nobleman
 Liu Jiyuan, emperor of Northern Han
 Maelpeadair Ua Tolaid, Irish abbot
 Marino Cassianico, bishop of Venice

References